Oh What a Beautiful Morning is a 2000 live album from Eels. It features highlights from the band's Daisies of the Galaxy tour, as well as several acoustic solo tracks recorded live at several concerts where Eels opened for Fiona Apple.

Track listing
All songs written by E, except where noted:
"Feeling Good" (Leslie Bricusse and Anthony Newley) – 2:32
"Overture"  – 7:02
Composed of:
"Last Stop: This Town" (E and Mike Simpson)
"Beautiful Freak"
"Rags to Rags"
"Your Lucky Day in Hell" (E and Mark Goldenberg)
"My Descent into Madness" (E, Paul Huston, Dan Nakamura, and Simpson)
"Novocaine for the Soul" (E and Goldenberg)
"Flower" (E and Jacobsen)
"Oh, What a Beautiful Morning" (Rodgers and Hammerstein) – 6:01
"Abortion in the Sky" – 1:29
"It's a Motherfucker" – 2:06
"Fucker" – 2:18
"Ant Farm" – 2:08
"Climbing to the Moon" – 4:06
"Grace Kelly Blues" – 3:31
"Daisies of the Galaxy" – 4:02
"Flyswatter" – 8:06
"Vice President Fruitley" (Butch, E, and Germano) – 3:13
"Hot and Cold" (Butch) – 3:10
"Mr. E's Beautiful Blues" (E and Simpson) – 2:23
"Not Ready Yet" (Jon Brion and E) – 4:05
"Susan's House" (E, Jim Jacobsen, and Jim Weatherly) – 4:28
"Something Is Sacred" – 2:37

Recording
Tracks 1, 4, 5, 9, 10, 14, and 17 were recorded on June 25–26, 2000 in Los Angeles at The Roxy.
2, 3, 6, 7, and 13 – July 21, 2000, Glasgow
8 – March 24, 2000, Dijon, France
11 – July 31 or August 1, 2000, Melbourne, Australia
12 – July 11, 2000, Utrecht, Netherlands
15 – July 28, 2000, Sydney, Australia
16 – May 25, 2000, Paris

Personnel
Eels
Orest Balaban – Bass guitar
Butch – Drums, percussion, and vocals on "Hot and Cold"
Steve Crum – Trumpet
E – Vocals, guitar, and keyboards
Lisa Germano – Guitar and backing vocals
Probyn Gregory – trumpet, trombone, banjo, melodica, guitar
David Hlebo – Saxophone

Production
E – Production
Dan Hersch – Mastering

References

External links 

 NME review
 Under the Radar review

Self-released albums
Eels (band) live albums
2000 live albums
Albums produced by Mark Oliver Everett